Daniel "Danny" Streiff (born c. 1960) is a former Swiss curler.

He works as the president of the Ronco s A., Stäfa Curling Club. At the time of the 1987 World Championship, he was employed as a machine engineer.

Teams

References

External links

 Profile at CurlingLiga.ch

Living people
Swiss male curlers
European curling champions
Swiss curling champions
1960s births
Swiss engineers